Rob Debney (born 15 December 1973) is a former professional rugby union referee who represented the English Rugby Union. He now competes in Ironman competitions.

Rugby union career

Playing career

Amateur career

A neck injury stopped Debney's playing career while he was still at school and he began refereeing.

Referee career

Professional career

Debney was a referee for the English Rugby Union from 1999 to 2011.

He refereed his first English Premiership match in 2004.

He refereed his first 1872 Cup match on 2 January 2009.

International career

Debney refereed the U21 World Cup final in 2003.

Outside of rugby

Debney is a Director of Sales at TOMZ Corporation. He occasionally writes rugby union articles for The Times newspaper.

References

Living people
English rugby union referees
Rugby union officials
1973 births
1872 Cup referees